The Charley River is an  tributary of the Yukon River in the U.S. state of Alaska. Flowing generally northeast from the Mertie Mountains (named after geologist John Beaver Mertie, Jr.) in the northeastern part of the state, the river lies entirely within Yukon–Charley Rivers National Preserve.

In 1980, the Charley River and all of its main tributaries became part of the National Wild and Scenic Rivers System.

The Charley River watershed is forested chiefly with black spruce and white spruce. This general locus within the Yukon River catchment is the approximate westernmost limit of the black spruce, Picea mariana. The river forms part of the boundary between the Southeast Fairbanks and Yukon–Koyukuk census areas.

Boating
The Charley River is generally floated by raft or inflatable canoe or kayak. The upper river is rated Class III (intermediate) on the International Scale of River Difficulty, rising to Class IV (advanced) in high water. The lower  are rated Class II (novice) to III. Dangers include swift current, overhanging or submerged vegetation, rocks, rapids, and weather-related fluctuations in water levels.

See also
List of rivers of Alaska

References

Works cited
 J.G. Clough et al. 1995. Geological Map of the Charley Basin, Alaska Department of Fish and Game
 C. Michael Hogan. 2008. Black Spruce: Picea mariana, GlobalTwitcher.com, ed. Nicklas Stromberg

Rivers of Alaska
Rivers of Southeast Fairbanks Census Area, Alaska
Rivers of Yukon–Koyukuk Census Area, Alaska
Wild and Scenic Rivers of the United States
Tributaries of the Yukon River
Rivers of Unorganized Borough, Alaska